Ilka Semmler (born 8 September 1985) is a German retired beach volleyball player. From 2006 to 2016, she played with Katrin Holtwick. They competed in the 2012 Summer Olympics in London, where they were eliminated in the first knock-out round by the other German team of Ludwig and Goller.

Professional career

2016 World Tour
At the 2016 Grand Slam in Long Beach, California, (Germany vs Germany) the pair finished 4th after a loss to their compatriots Chantal Laboureur/Julia Sude in straight sets (21-16, 21-17).

In September 2016, Semmler and Holtwick both retired after they were eliminated in the German Beach Volleyball Championship.

References

External links
 
 
 

1985 births
German women's beach volleyball players
Living people
Beach volleyball players at the 2012 Summer Olympics
Olympic beach volleyball players of Germany
Sportspeople from Aachen